Speed skating at the 2017 Asian Winter Games was held in Obihiro, Japan between 19–23 February at Meiji Hokkaido-Tokachi Oval. A total of 14 events (seven for each gender) were held.

Schedule

Medalists

Men

Women

Medal table

Participating nations
A total of 78 athletes from 10 nations competed in short track speed skating at the 2017 Asian Winter Games:

 
 
 
 
 
 
 
 
 
 

* Australia and New Zealand as guest nations, were ineligible to win any medals.

References

External links
Official Results Book – Speed Skating

 
2017 Asian Winter Games events
2017
2017 in speed skating